Jaime Mirtenbaum Zenamon (born 1953) is a classical guitarist and composer. He was born in La Paz, Bolivia, and studied guitar and composition in Israel, Spain and Portugal as well as in South America. He taught at the Berlin Academy of Music from 1980 to 1992. He now lives in Curitiba, Brazil.

In addition to advanced concert repertoire, he has written a number of pieces for beginning and intermediate guitar students, some of which have been included in collections of student repertoire.

Articles
Duo Borgomanero-Zenamon divulga roteiro de concertos com entrada livre October 2006, by Desiderio Peron (INSIEME) 
Jaime Zenamon e Daise Sartori apresentam Conserto Natalino December 2005 (Campo Mourão)

External links
Biography at edition ex tempore
Info (at arton Konzertdirektion, Berlin)
Zwischen Tradition und Moderne - der Komponist Jaime Zenamon über seine Arbeit (Interview in German)

20th-century classical composers
21st-century classical composers
Bolivian classical guitarists
Bolivian composers
Bolivian male musicians
Bolivian expatriates in Brazil
Bolivian expatriates in Germany
Bolivian people of German descent
Composers for the classical guitar
People from Curitiba
People from La Paz
1953 births
Living people
Male classical composers
20th-century guitarists
21st-century guitarists
20th-century male musicians
21st-century male musicians